Jeison Medina Escobar (born 27 February 1995) is a Colombian professional footballer who plays as a forward for Super League Greece club Lamia.

Career
Born in Itagüí, Medina represented Atlético Nacional as a youth but was released at the age of 15. He later represented amateur sides Comfenalco, Club La Mazzia and Ditaires FC, scoring more than 60 goals for the latter side.

In January 2016, Medina agreed to a move to Serie D side Catiadas, but the move was cancelled due to paperwork problems. On 1 February 2017, he signed a one-year deal with Leones in Categoría Primera B after being approved on a trial held at his hometown.

Medina made his debut for Leones on 11 February 2017, starting in a 0–1 home loss against Valledupar. He scored his first goals on 11 March, netting a brace in a 3–2 home defeat of Deportes Quindío, and finished the season with 18 goals as his side achieved promotion.

Medina made his professional debut on 3 February 2018, starting and scoring the equalizer in a 1–2 Categoría Primera A home loss against América de Cali; it was also Leones' first goal in the first division. On 12 June he moved abroad, signing a one-year loan deal with Segunda División side Real Zaragoza, with a buyout clause.

On 28 January 2019 América de Cali announced that they had signed Medina. In the 2020 season, he moved to Deportivo Pasto.

References

External links

1995 births
Living people
People from Itagüí
Colombian footballers
Association football wingers
Association football forwards
Categoría Primera A players
Categoría Primera B players
Segunda División players
Qatar Stars League players
Leones F.C. footballers
Real Zaragoza players
América de Cali footballers
Deportivo Pasto footballers
Al-Shamal SC players
Colombian expatriate footballers
Colombian expatriate sportspeople in Spain
Colombian expatriate sportspeople in Qatar
Expatriate footballers in Spain
Expatriate footballers in Qatar
Sportspeople from Antioquia Department